Auden Schendler is an American climate activist, businessman and author of Getting Green Done.  He is Senior Vice President of Sustainability at Aspen Skiing Company.

Schendler has written extensively about the difficulties of enacting sustainability initiatives in the business world and the ineffectiveness of conventional green business practices in the face of climate change.  He has been featured in Men's Journal, Businessweek,  Outside, Fast Company  Harvard Business Review, Slate, and Scientific American's Earth 3.0.

He has published numerous essays on climate change, politics, parenting, and the outdoors   and speaks regularly about climate change and what constitutes meaningful action. At Aspen Skiing Company Schendler is part of a team that has developed several innovative utility-scale clean energy systems, including a microhydroelectric plant, a solar photovoltaic farm, and a coal mine methane-to-electricity project, the first of its kind west of the Mississippi.

The bulk of Auden's work is around scale solutions to climate change, primarily through movement building, policy, and power wielding from the outdoor industry. Auden serves on the board of Protect Our Winters and has been a commissioner on Colorado's Air Quality Control Commission and a member of Basalt, Colorado's town council.

References

External links 
 gettinggreendone.com
 
 
 

American non-fiction environmental writers
Living people
Year of birth missing (living people)
Place of birth missing (living people)